"For Those Who Like to Groove" is a song recorded by R&B band Raydio for the group's 1980 album, Two Places at the Same Time. It was released as a single in 1980 by Arista Records. The song reached number 14 on the Billboard Hot Soul Songs chart and No. 23 on the Billboard Hot Dance Club Play chart.

Overview
"For Those Who Like to Groove" was written and produced by Ray Parker Jr. The single's B-side was the song "Can't Keep from Cryin'". Both tracks came from Raydio's 1980 studio album Two Places at the Same Time.

References

1980 singles
1980 songs
Raydio songs
Arista Records singles